Oreochromis korogwe (Korogwe tilapia) is a species of cichlid native to Kenya and Tanzania, where it occurs in the Pangani River system, as well as the Zigi River.

References

korogwe
Freshwater fish of Tanzania
Fish described in 1955
Taxonomy articles created by Polbot